The Hard Sell (Encore) is an album by DJ Shadow and Cut Chemist.  It was released in 2008. The entire mix performed live and recorded during rehearsals for the Hard Sell tour, November 2007, at the pink house.

Track listing
 "On a Mission" - 5:19
 "Jukebox Rock" - 7:36
 "Funky" - 6:57
 "Chilled" - 6:53
 "Sun Used to Shine" - 3:10
 "Fused of Course" - 17:28
 "Toro Toro" - 2:56
 "Hooked on Atari" - 23:48
 "Turned Around and Time Warped" - 4:48

Production
DJ Shadow and Cut Chemist used 8 turntables, 4 mixers, 2 guitar pedals, and a large quantity of 7-inch vinyl.

Samples
Jukebox Rock
 "Rock Around the Clock" by Telex
 "Eye of the Tiger" by Big Daddy

Funky
 "Passin' Me By" by The Pharcyde
 "Apache" by Incredible Bongo Band
 "It's a New Day" by Skull Snaps

Chilled
 "Father Figure" by George Michael
 "En Focus" by De La Soul
 "Try Again" by Aaliyah
 "Jimmi Diggin Cats" by Digable Planets
 "Mistadobalina" by Del tha Funkee Homosapien

Sun Used to Shine
 "Synthetic Substitution" by Melvin Bliss
 "Magic Mountain" by War on Love Is All Around

Fused of Course
 Smash Hits Interview flexi disc with Spandau Ballet
 Spoken words by Robert Plant
 "Soupy" by Maggie Thrett
 "We Will Rock You" by Queen

Toro Toro

Hooked on Atari
 "When I Hear Music" by Debbie Deb
 "I Never Scared" by Bonecrusher
 "The Way You Move" by OutKast
 "Everlong" by The Foo Fighters
 "Somebody To Love" by Jefferson Airplane
 "Break on Through (To the Other Side)" by The Doors
 "Whoa, Back, Buck!" by Dave Plaehn
 "Space Invaders" by Player One
 "Hater" by Various Production

Turned Around And Time Warped
 "A Few More Kisses To Go" by Isaac Hayes

References

 Liner notes from the album.

Cut Chemist albums
DJ Shadow albums
2008 live albums